The Indonesian National Police Partners Communication Center (Sentra Komunikasi Mitra Kepolisian Negara Republik Indonesia, abbreviated and commonly known as Senkom Mitra Polri) are  neighborhood watch groups in Indonesia that inform and assist the members of Indonesian National Police (Polri) in providing information and reporting any kind of public threats to the law enforcement.

Senkom Mitra Polri is a non-government organization established by members of the Security and Order Partners of the Police Headquarters on January 1, 2004, in Jakarta, Indonesia.

Scope and Activities
As a police partner, Senkom coordinates and provides information to the legal authorities of either the central government, local government, or the military police about security or public order disturbances, matters of national stability, and any natural disasters occurring in areas where Senkom members are located.

Senkom Mitra Polri's activities include:
Monitoring the weather, traffic, situation reports by the Kamtibmas.
Cooperating with the government agencies in training and socialization of human resources.
Providing hands-on service and communications assistance in the event of disasters, accidents, and safety demonstrations.

See also

 National Neighborhood Watch Program
 Neighborhood watch

References

 Senkom Mitra Polri
 Senkom Mitra Polri
 Senkom
 Senkom Bali
 Polres Kuningan
 Mabes Polri
 Badan SAR Nasional
 Senkom Bangkalan

Further reading
  (July 22, 2009.) "Asked to Participate Aceh Senkom Help Fight Drugs." Berita Sore.
  (April 17, 2011). "Thank Senkom Regent Partners Banyumas Police." Tunas Bangsa.
  Wijaya, Bodhiya (December 24, 2009). "Police Help Secure Partner Senkom Christmas & New Year." Detik Surabaya.
   Hidup, Berita Gaya (September 9, 2010). "Police and Partners Tokobagus.com Senkom Degree Post Mudik Lebaran." Bali Post.
  (January 14, 2012). "Binjai Mayor Welcomes Establishment of Branches Communications Center." Harian Analisa (English: Daily analysis).
  (April 23, 2008). "Members of the Communications Center hacked." Suara Merdeka Day.

External links
  Senkom Mitra Polri
 Senkom Bali
 Senkom Denpasar
 Senkom Bangkalan

Law enforcement agencies of Indonesia